The Fourth from the Right (German: Die vierte von rechts) is a 1929 German silent comedy film directed by Conrad Wiene and starring Ossi Oswalda, Betty Bird and Arthur Pusey. The film's sets were designed by the art director Emil Hasler. It was released by the German subsidiary of Fox Film.

Cast
 Ossi Oswalda as Josyane  
 Betty Bird as Betty  
 Arthur Pusey as Lord Douglas Blandford  
 Adolphe Engers as Bob Murphy 
 Albert Paulig 
 Gustav Püttjer 
 Fritz Spira 
 Mathilde Sussin 
 Otto Wallburg

References

Bibliography
 Frank-Burkhard Habel. Verrückt vor Begehren.: Die Filmdiven aus der Stummfilmzeit. Ein leidenschaftlicher Blick zurück in die Zeit der ersten Stars.. Schwarzkopf und Schwarzkopf, 1999.

External links

1929 films
Films of the Weimar Republic
Films directed by Conrad Wiene
German silent feature films
German black-and-white films
German comedy films
1929 comedy films
Silent comedy films
1920s German films